Dane Hussey (born July 26, 1949) is a weightlifter for the United States.  His coaches are/were Gayle Hatch and Walter Imahara.

Career
In the 56-kilogram weight class for the 55- to 59-year-old men, Hussey was able to put up a total of 110 kilograms to lead his weight class. Ten years later, he was able to total 100-kilograms in the 65- to 69-year-old age group in the 55-kilogram weight class.

Weightlifting achievements
Teenage National Champion (1968, 1969)
Junior National Champion (1971)
Pan American Games team member (1975)
Olympic Games team member (First Alternate 1976)
Blue Swords Invitational team member (1979, East Germany)
Senior National Champion (1975, 1976)
American Masters Champion (2004, 2006, 2008, 2010, 2011, 2013, 2014, 2015, 2020)
National Masters Champion (2005, 2006, 2007, 2008, 2009, 2010, 2011, 2012, 2016, 2017, 2020)
Pan American Masters Champion (2007, 2011, 2015, 2019, 2020)
American Masters record holder in snatch, clean and jerk, and Total in the 56 kg and 62 kg weight classes.
National Masters record holder in snatch, clean and jerk, and Total in the 55 kg and 56 kg weight classes.
Pan American Masters record holder in snatch, clean and jerk, and Total in the 55 kg and 56 kg weight classes.
Gold medal at the U.S. Masters Weightlifting Championships

References

External links
Dane Hussey - Hall of Fame at Weightlifting Exchange

1949 births
Living people
American male weightlifters
20th-century American people
21st-century American people